Kastriot Imeri (born 27 June 2000) is a Swiss professional footballer who plays as a midfielder for Swiss Super League club BSC Young Boys and the Switzerland national team.

Career
Imeri joined Servette's youth academy from FC Meyrin. At only 16 years of age, he debuted in the first team on 6 March 2017 in a 1-0 away victory over Le Mont in the Swiss Challenge League. From the following season onward, he fully joined the first team. He shot his first goal in a 4-0 victory over FC Aarau on 24 February 2018. He accompanied his team to promotion to the Swiss Super League as Challenge League champions in the 2018-19 season.

In the 2021-22 season, his final season at Servette, he scored the most goals for his team with eleven goals in 26 games, the eight most of the entire league.

On 16 August 2022, despite lucrative interest from foreign leagues, he signed a four-year deal with fellow Swiss Super League side BSC Young Boys for a record 3.5m CHF.

International career
Born in Switzerland, Imeri is of Kosovo Albanian descent. Imeri is a youth international for Switzerland, often captaining their youth sides.

He made his debut for Switzerland national team on 12 November 2021 in a World Cup qualifier against Italy.

References

External links

Servette Profile
SFL Profile
SFV U16 Profile
SFV U17 Profile
SFV U18 Profile
SFV U19 Profile
SFV U20 Profile

2000 births
Living people
Swiss people of Kosovan descent
Footballers from Geneva
Swiss men's footballers
Association football midfielders
Switzerland international footballers
Switzerland under-21 international footballers
Switzerland youth international footballers
Swiss Super League players
Swiss Challenge League players
Servette FC players